Charles S. Baltazar (born May 22, 1947, in Fort Morgan, Colorado)
is a retired American Thoroughbred horse racing jockey who rode regularly from 1964 to 1990. After retiring he became a participant in Western disciplines as a non-professional in National Reined Cow Horse Association events.

Riding career
Chuck Baltazar began riding in 1964 in Nebraska then in 1965 went east to Detroit and soon to tracks on the East Coast. In 1971, he rode the two-year-old Riva Ridge in his first four races before Ron Turcotte took over.
On December 15, 1969, Chuck Baltazar, broke all Maryland riding records when he rode home seven consecutive winners at Laurel Park racetrack.
 Baltazar had two starts in each of the U.S. Triple Crown series. His best result in the Kentucky Derby came in the 1972 running when he rode Freetex to a sixth-place finish. In the Preakness Stakes his best result a fourth aboard Sound Off in the 1971 edition. His seventh place in the 1972 Belmont Stakes, again aboard Freetex, was his best.

References

1947 births
Living people
American jockeys
People from Fort Morgan, Colorado